Tanjong Manis is a federal constituency in Mukah Division (Tanjung Manis District) and Sarikei Division (Sarikei District), Sarawak, Malaysia, that has been represented in the Dewan Rakyat since 2008.

The federal constituency was created in the 2005 redistribution and is mandated to return a single member to the Dewan Rakyat under the first past the post voting system.

Demographics 
https://ge15.orientaldaily.com.my/seats/sarawak/p

History

Polling districts 
According to the gazette issued on 31 October 2022, the Tanjong Manis constituency has a total of 14 polling districts.

Representation history

State constituency

Current state assembly members

Local governments

Election results

References

Sarawak federal constituencies